Da Costa Araújo is a surname. Notable people with the surname include:

Bruno Tiago da Costa Araújo (born 1989), Brazilian footballer
José Carlos da Costa Araújo (1962–2009), Brazilian footballer
Urbano Santos da Costa Araújo (1859–1922), Brazilian politician

Compound surnames